Van Lal Hruaia (born 25 May 1991) is a footballer from Myanmar who plays as a goalkeeper for Rakhine United. He made his international debut on 30 March 2015 against Indonesia.

References

1991 births
Living people
Burmese footballers
Myanmar international footballers
Ayeyawady United F.C. players
Association football goalkeepers